Ruth Zavaleta Salgado (born August 27, 1966) is a Mexican politician. She was affiliated with the Party of the Democratic Revolution (PRD) until November 2009  but changed and is currently part of the Ecologist Green Party of Mexico. She is a founding member of the PRD and the first female PRD politician to serve as President of the Chamber of Deputies 2007-2008.

Personal life and education
Zavaleta holds a bachelor's degree in sociology from the National Autonomous University of Mexico (UNAM).

Political career
In 1989 Zavaleta was one of the founders of the PRD.  In 1997 Cuauhtemoc Cárdenas designated her as Secretary of Social Development in the government of the Mexican Federal District; she then served (1998–2000) as Secretary of Finance in the Mexican Federal District.

From 2000 to 2003 she served in the Legislative Assembly of the Mexican Federal District.   In 2003 she was elected borough mayor (Jefe Delegacional) of Venustiano Carranza.

In 2006 Zavaleta won a seat in the Chamber of Deputies of Mexico; hence she was serving during the LX Legislature of the Mexican Congress. In 2007 she was elected President of the Chamber of Deputies Directive Board for the second year of the LX Legislature (September 2007–August 2008).

References

External links

1966 births
Living people
Party of the Democratic Revolution politicians
Members of the Chamber of Deputies (Mexico)
Presidents of the Chamber of Deputies (Mexico)
Mayors of places in Mexico
Women members of the Chamber of Deputies (Mexico)
Mexican people of Basque descent
Women mayors of places in Mexico
Members of the Congress of Mexico City
21st-century Mexican politicians
21st-century Mexican women politicians
Women legislative speakers
20th-century Mexican politicians
20th-century Mexican women politicians
Deputies of the LX Legislature of Mexico